Motyka, meaning hoe may refer to:

 Motyka (surname)
 Motyka, Podlaskie Voivodeship, Poland

See also
 Siekiera, motyka ("Axe, Hoe"), a Polish military song
 Mattock
 Motya